Döllbach (in its upper course: Döllau) is a river of Bavaria and Hesse, Germany. It flows into the Fliede near Eichenzell.

See also
List of rivers of Hesse

References

Rivers of Bavaria
Rivers of Hesse
Rivers of Germany